The 1966–67 NCAA University Division men's ice hockey season began in November 1966 and concluded with the 1967 NCAA University Division Men's Ice Hockey Tournament's championship game on March 18, 1967 at the Onondaga County War Memorial in Syracuse, New York. This was the 20th season in which an NCAA ice hockey championship was held and is the 73rd year overall where an NCAA school fielded a team.

New Hampshire returned to a partial University Division schedule but still qualified for the lower-tier ECAC playoffs for this and the following season. They would become a full-time top division program for the 1968–69 season.

Cornell's win was the first by an eastern team since 1954 ending the 12-year dominance of the WCHA.

On June 7, 1967, Al Karlander became the first NCAA player to be selected in an NHL Draft.

Regular season

Season tournaments

Standings

1967 NCAA Tournament

Note: * denotes overtime period(s)

Player stats

Scoring leaders
The following players led the league in points at the conclusion of the season.

GP = Games played; G = Goals; A = Assists; Pts = Points; PIM = Penalty minutes

Leading goaltenders
The following goaltenders led the league in goals against average at the end of the regular season while playing at least 33% of their team's total minutes.

GP = Games played; Min = Minutes played; W = Wins; L = Losses; OT = Overtime/shootout losses; GA = Goals against; SO = Shutouts; SV% = Save percentage; GAA = Goals against average

Awards

NCAA

ECAC

WCHA

See also
 1966–67 NCAA College Division men's ice hockey season

References

External links
College Hockey Historical Archives
1966–67 NCAA Standings

 
NCAA